Aurimas Lankas (born 7 September 1985 in Šiauliai) is a Lithuanian sprint canoer.

In 2014 Canoe Sprint European Championships Aurimas Lankas and Edvinas Ramanauskas won silver medals in K2-200 m event. In 2014 World Championships Lankas and Ramanauskas reached the final where they finished in 5th place.

References

External links
 
 

1985 births
Lithuanian male canoeists
Living people
Sportspeople from Šiauliai
European Games competitors for Lithuania
Canoeists at the 2015 European Games
Canoeists at the 2016 Summer Olympics
Olympic canoeists of Lithuania
Olympic bronze medalists for Lithuania
Olympic medalists in canoeing
Medalists at the 2016 Summer Olympics